Anania flava is a moth of the family Crambidae that was described by Koen V. N. Maes in 2005 and lives in Kenya.

References

Moths described in 2005
Pyraustinae
Moths of Africa